Mustjõgi is a river in Estonia-Latvia border. The river is 94 km long. The river starts from Suur Saarjärv and runs into Koiva River.

References

Rivers of Estonia
Rivers of Latvia